Repulse, sometimes written as Due Repulse, was a 40/48-gun ship of the English Tudor navy, launched in 1596.

Repulse was rebuilt in 1610 as a great ship of 34 principal  guns, plus 6 smaller anti-personnel guns.

In 1613 The Repulse was appointed to escort Princess Elizabeth, daughter of James VI and I, and Frederick V of the Palatinate sailing in The Prince Royal from Margate to Ostend.

She was broken up in 1649.

Notes

References
Citations

Bibliography

Lavery, Brian (2003) The Ship of the Line - Volume 1: The development of the battlefleet 1650-1850. Conway Maritime Press. .

Ships of the English navy
16th-century ships